Kronprinsessegade 26 is a listed, Neoclassical property overlooking Rosenborg Castle Garden in central Copenhagen, Denmark. The building was listed on the Danish registry of protected buildings and places in 1932.

History
Kronprinsessegade 26 was built by city builder (stadskonduktør) Jørgen Henrich Rawert in 1805-1806. He also constructed the neighbouring buildings at No. 28 and No. 30. Rawert lived in the building at No. 26 from 1806 to 1816.

The politician Harald Raasløff was a resident in the building in 1855-56. He served as Minister of Schlesvig Affairs from 12 December 1854 to 8 February 1856. C. A. von Schepelern (1794-1870),, commandant of Copenhagen, was a resident in the building from 1857 to 1875.

Architecture

The main wing consists of three storeys over a high cellar and is five bays wide. The windows on the first floor have baluster decorations. The two outer windows on the first floor are topped by triangular pediments and the three central ones are topped by a frieze.

A gateway topped by a fanlight opens to a narrow courtyard. A 13 bay side wing extends from the rear side of the building.

An inscription above the gateway in the courtyard reads "pax habitantibus" and lists a number of names and years: "Revert 1804 - Smidt 1810 - Kaas Lehn 1810 - Rosenørn Lehn 1820 - Heyliger 1825 - Scheel 1867 - Holmblad 1873 - Lemvigh-Müller 1911".

Gallery

References

External links

 Ulrikke Kaas

Listed residential buildings in Copenhagen
Residential buildings completed in 1805
1805 establishments in Denmark